The 1982 season of the African Cup Winners' Cup football club tournament was won by El Mokawloon SC in two-legged final victory against Power Dynamos F.C. This was the eighth season that the tournament took place for the winners of each African country's domestic cup. thirty-three sides entered the competition, with Printing Agency withdrawing before the 1st leg of the first round and Gor Mahia withdrawing after the 1st leg of the same round.

Preliminary round

|}

First round

|}

1:National Printing Agency withdrew before 1st leg.
2:AS Vita Club won 5-4 on PSO.
3:Gor Mahia withdrew after 1st leg.

Second round

|}

1:USK Algiers advanced on away goals rule.
2:Power Dynamos F.C. won 5-3 on PSO.
3:Accra Hearts of Oak SC won 4-3 on PSO.

Quarterfinals

|}

Semifinals

|}

Final

|}

Champions

External links
 Results available on CAF Official Website

African Cup Winners' Cup
2